The Dehani lift irrigation scheme is a technologically sophisticated project to irrigate Vidarbha, a large, semi-arid region of India.

Background
Vidharba is a semi-arid region that has an ailing agricultural community which has huge amounts of debts. This has led to a high farm suicide rate.

Details
The project is being executed by Vidarbha Irrigation Development Corporation and IVRCL Infrastructures and Projects Limited.
The project costed INR 1,988,300,000 (1.988 billion) and was completed in 2011.

This project was the first of its kind in India and envisions the drip irrigation of a large area, while making use of the latest in communication technology.  The Supervisory Control and Data Acquisition System (SCADA) will interconnect all components of the system via a satellite uplink, making it possible for the central command centre of the irrigation scheme to be able to control all components remotely.

Components

Bembla reservoir
The total project cost is expected to be INR 12.8 billion.

Approach channel
A  approach channel carries water from the Bembla reservoir into the Forebay Stage-1. The channel is of trapezoidal cross-section.

Forebay Stage-1

This structure functions as a storage space for water before it is pumped farther ahead.

Pumphouse Stage-1

Main Distribution Chamber (MDC) Stage-1

The remainder of the water is supplied to 34 Sub Distribution Chambers via pre-stressed concrete pipes which form part of the Gravity Mains.

Sub Distribution Chamber (SDC)
Each SDC, along with its associated instrument panel room and transformer, has been allocated a  area.

Each SDC has a  pump installed. A trained operator will be employed in each instrument panel room to make the relevant data entries regarding the type of crops on the sub-zones being serviced by that particular SDC. The programme distributes the exact amount of water required in each sub-zone and cuts off the flow when the requirement has been fulfilled.

The entire project has been divided into two stages, the first stage consists of 34 SDCs and the second stage consists of 23 SDCs. In all there will be 57 SDCs servicing the 57 zones that are subdivisions of the command area. Each zone is to be divided into 27 sub-zones. The SCADA system to be implemented is capable of delivering the exact amount of water required at each field according to the cropping pattern. It is proposed to train three representatives of the farming community from each zone, so that they will be able to operate the instrument panel of each SDC. For the initial three years of functioning, the IVRCL personnel will run the entire project, after which the responsibility of the day-to-day activities at the SDC will be handed over to the representatives of the farming community.

Forebay Stage-2
Part of the water stored in the MDC Stage-1 is supplied into this forebay.  From here  vertical turbine pumps (installed in the Pumphouse Stage-2) are used to pump the water farther ahead into the second stage of the project serviced by MDC Stage-2, which will supply 23 more SDCs.

References

External links
Vidarbha Irrigation Development Corporation

Environment of Maharashtra
Agriculture in Maharashtra
Lift irrigation schemes